Rusty Nail or Rusty nail often refers to:
 Literally, a nail (fastener) covered in rust

 Rusty Nail (cocktail),   Scotch and Drambuie
The terms may also refer to:

People
 Rusty Nails (filmmaker), a film director
 Rusty Nails, a children's entertainer who inspired The Simpsons character Krusty the Clown

Arts, entertainment, and media
 Ron Hawkins and the Rusty Nails, a Canadian rock band
 Rusty Nails (album), by Jackie Greene
 "Rusty Nail" (song), by metal band X Japan
 "Rusty Nail", a song by groove metal band Grip Inc.
 Rusty Nails, an EP by Moderat
 Rusty Nail, the villain of the film Joy Ride (2001) and its two sequels, portrayed by actor Ted Levine
 "The Rusty Nail", an episode of Greek